Positano is a 1996 Italian television comedy mini series written and directed by Vittorio Sindoni. It was broadcast on Rai 1.

Main cast

Amanda Sandrelli as Daria
Milly Carlucci as  Luisa
Duccio Giordano as  Andrea
Marta Armando as  Lucilla
Andrea Giordana 
Lorenzo Iavarone 
Angelo Infanti  
Ivo Garrani 
Anna Ammirati 
Franco Angrisano 
Carlotta Miti 
Gianfranco Barra

References

External links
 

1990s Italian-language films
Italian television films
Films directed by Vittorio Sindoni